Gremlin Industries was an American arcade game manufacturer active from 1971 to 1983, based in San Diego, California. Following its acquisition by Sega in 1978, the company was known as Gremlin/Sega or Sega/Gremlin. Sega/Gremlin's notable franchise is Head On. The company's name was subsequently changed to Sega Electronics in 1982, before it closed in 1983. Sega later released emulated and playable version of some of Sega/Gremlin games as vault material for the Sega Ages and Sega Genesis Collection series.

History 

Gremlin was founded in 1970 as a contract engineering firm by Harry Frank Fogleman and Carl E. Grindle. The duo had intended to name the company after themselves as "Grindleman Industries," but an employee of the Delaware Secretary of State's office misheard the name over the phone, so the company was incorporated as Gremlin instead. In 1973, Gremlin became a manufacturer of coin-operated wall games with their first release Play Ball (1973). Gremlin joined the video game industry in 1976 by releasing its first video arcade game entitled Blockade (1976). 

In 1978, Gremlin was acquired by Sega Enterprises Inc. and their games acquired the label of Gremlin/Sega or Sega/Gremlin. Following the Sega purchase, Gremlin began to release games from both Sega and other Japanese companies. Among these video games were Namco's Gee Bee (1978), Nichibutsu's Moon Cresta and Super Moon Cresta (both 1980) Nintendo's Space Firebird (1980), and Konami's Frogger (1981).

In 1982, the name of the company was changed to Sega Electronics to better strengthen the Sega brand name in the United States. However, they did not survive past the golden age of arcade video games. In August 1983, the arcade manufacturing division of the company were sold to Bally Manufacturing and through the purchase, Bally/Midway acquired Sega's technology for laserdisc video games, principally Astron Belt. They gained the right of first refusal to publish arcade games by the Japanese Sega Enterprises, Ltd. in the United States for two years, including games such as Up 'N Down, Future Spy, and Flicky. The sale did not affect game development division, research and development division, Sega Center arcades, and home cartridge business which stayed with Sega.

In 1984, Sega Enterprises, Ltd. itself was bought out in a management buyout by Sega executives David Rosen and Hayao Nakayama with backing from CSK Corporation, taking Gremlin games library with it. 

After the sale of arcade manufacturing assets and management buyout of Sega, Sega Electronics became a shell company (holding only Gremlin brand trademarks in several countries, later divested to Warner Bros.). It was renamed to Ages Electronics in 1985 (later used as production company related to The Maury Povich Show and currently part of CBS Media Ventures). 

Trademarks for Gremlin brand in the United States are now expired. In Japan, it is currently owned by Warner Bros. Entertainment (owner of Gremlins movie franchise and coincidentally, a successor to Bally/Midway after acquisition of most of Midway Games assets in 2009) while Sega retained the Sega/Gremlin trademark ownership. In several countries, Warner Bros. obtained the rights to Gremlin brand from both Ages Electronics and unrelated British company Gremlin Interactive.

Video games

Produced

Distributed

Ports
Sega released emulated and playable versions of some of the Sega/Gremlin arcade games as vault material in the Sega Ages compilation series for the Sega Saturn, PlayStation 2, Xbox 360, and PlayStation 3 and Sega Genesis Collection for the PlayStation 2 and PlayStation Portable.

Deep Scan was included as a bonus game in the Sega Saturn version of Die Hard Arcade.

Explanatory notes

References

Sega divisions and subsidiaries
Companies based in San Diego
Manufacturing companies established in 1971
Manufacturing companies disestablished in 1983
Defunct video game companies of the United States